3 Doors Down or variation, may refer to:

 3 Doors Down, U.S. rock band
 3 Doors Down (album), 2008 eponymous album by 3 Doors Down
 3 Doors Down Café and Lounge, an Italian restaurant in Portland, Oregon, US

See also

 

 Two Doors Down (disambiguation)
 Next Door (disambiguation)